Living Word International Christian Church is a multi-ethnic, Intergenerational, interdenominational church located in Silver Spring, Maryland. When the church first founded in 1982 then incorporated in 1985, it was called Immanuel's Church. The church is a  large, diverse congregation focused on fulfilling its mission of being an Apostolic Center in the North-East region of the United States.

History 

Living Word International Christian Church was founded in 1982, rooted in the belief that Jesus Christ, the only begotten Son of God, is our only hope for Salvation.  The church was formally incorporated on October 30, 1985, in Montgomery County, Maryland, as a non-denominational, Christ-loving church.

Today, Living Word is a multicultural, non-denominational church with a membership of over 1,000 men, women, and children from over 70 countries.

External links
 

Christianity in Silver Spring, Maryland
Evangelical megachurches in the United States
Christian organizations established in 1982
Churches in Montgomery County, Maryland
1982 establishments in Maryland

www.lwicc.org